Czesław Karol Marchewczyk (1 October 1912 — 11 November 2003), was a Polish ice hockey player. He played for KS Cracovia during his career, as well as the Polish national team at several world championships as well as the 1932, 1936, and 1948 Winter Olympics. He would later be awarded the Knight's Cross of the Order of Polonia Restituta.

References

External links

1912 births
2003 deaths
Ice hockey players at the 1932 Winter Olympics
Ice hockey players at the 1936 Winter Olympics
Ice hockey players at the 1948 Winter Olympics
Knights of the Order of Polonia Restituta
MKS Cracovia (ice hockey) players
Olympic ice hockey players of Poland
Polish Austro-Hungarians
Polish ice hockey forwards
Recipients of the Armia Krajowa Cross
Sportspeople from Kraków